Måns Oskar Söderqvist (born 8 February 1993) is a Swedish professional footballer who plays for Oskarshamns AIK as a forward.

Club career
On 23 December 2021, Söderqvist joined Oskarshamns AIK for the 2022 season.

References

External links
 
 

1993 births
People from Emmaboda Municipality
Living people
Swedish footballers
Sweden youth international footballers
Sweden under-21 international footballers
Association football forwards
Kalmar FF players
Hammarby Fotboll players
Trelleborgs FF players
Oskarshamns AIK players
Allsvenskan players
Superettan players
Ettan Fotboll players
Sportspeople from Kalmar County